is a Japanese businessman and former actor from Tokyo, a graduate of Horikoshi High School. His debut role was in Boogiepop Phantom where he voiced the character Poom Poom. He later had a starring role in the 2005 Kamen Rider Series Kamen Rider Hibiki and its film Kamen Rider Hibiki & The Seven Senki as the character Asumu Adachi. His roles have also included the drama RH Plus as Ageha Seto and in the film Aquarian Age: The Movie as Naoya Itsuki. On February 28, 2018, he announced his decision to retire from the entertainment industry to take over his father's company.

Filmography

Films
 Kamen Rider Hibiki & The Seven Senki (2005) – Asumu Adachi
 One Missed Call: Final (2007) – Shin'ichi Imahara
 Battle of Demons (2009) - Minaha Hayasaki
 Junjou (2010) - Keisuke Tozaki
 Nana to Kaoru (2011) – Kaoru 
 Nana to Kaoru: Chapter 2 (2012) – Kaoru
 The Eternal Zero (2013) – Teranishi
 Tokusou Sentai Dekaranger: 10 Years after (2015) - Assam Asimov
 A Man Called Pirate (2016)

Television
 Kamen Rider Hibiki (2005 –2006) – Asumu Adachi
 RH Plus (2008) - Seto Ageha
 Ryōmaden (2010) – Okita Sōji
 Teen Court: 10-dai Saiban (2012) – Kunio Sakai

Television animation
 Eden of the East (2009) – Policeman

Video games
 Saikin Koi Shiteru? (2009) - Ruka Kazama

References

External links
 Official profile at Knocks, Inc. 
 Personal blog 
 

1989 births
Living people
Male actors from Tokyo
Horikoshi High School alumni